The 2011 Super Girl, also known as 2011 BBK Super Girl for sponsor reasons, premiered on HBS Hunan Satellite TV on May 1, 2011. The format had competitors give a performance, after which, viewers called in to vote for their favourite singers. The weakest two, as voted by the judges and the audience's text messages, faced-off subsequently in a head to head knock out PK, short for Player Kill. The loser of the PK would be eliminated each week until only one contestant remained the winner.

Regional contest
National Top 20 Qualifications
 Qualified
 Eliminated 
 Eliminated by Regional Finals

Final Contest
 Champion
 Penalize during Super Girl School
 Retired
 Eliminated

Episode 1: Top 12 into 11
 Contestant №13 Sun Xinxin retired before the beginning of this episode.
Special guest singer
Vivi Jiang Yingrong
Professional Judges
Xiao Ke
Wu Zhoutong
Hu Haiquan
Weibo Judges
Li Chengpeng
Zuo Yeben
Hanyizaici
Xiao Qiang
Su Cen
Yu Leping
Sisi Laoshi
1,000 Public Audiences (votes)

Round 1: New Voice PK
 Contestant №1 Yu Jiali penalize for Round 1

Round 1 PK

Round 2: Quarta Roulette PK
 Contestant №3 Jin Yinling penalize for Round 2

Professional Judges' Final Judgement

Round 3: Contestants Voting

Round 4: Final PK

Episode 2: Top 11 into 10
Professional Judges
Sa Dingding
Hu Haiquan
Xiao Ke
Weibo Judges
Chenlanshui Yao
Ma Wei CUC (CUC)
Hanyizaici
Da Peng
Ye Zichun
Li Dingwen
Sisi Laoshi
1,000 Public Audiences (votes)

Round 1: Team Leader PK
 Contestant №7 Wang Yijie penalize for Round 1

Round 1 PK

Round 2: Quarta Roulette PK
 Contestant №8 Yang Yang penalize for Round 2

Professional Judges' Final Judgement

Round 3: Contestants Voting

Round 4: Final PK

Episode 3: Top 10 into 9
Special guest singer
Lo Ta-yu
Professional Judges
Sa Dingding
Hu Haiquan
Cai Guoqing
Weibo Judges
Paoxiao Nulang Bai Bangni
Ma Rila
Chaoren Xu Fengli
Li Dingwen
Zhèng Yàqí
1,000 Public Audiences (votes)

Round 1: Popularity Rank PK
 Contestant №10 Lu Yi penalize for Round 1

Round 1 PK

Round 2: Trios PK
 Contestant №2 Lisi Danni penalize for Round 2

Round 3: Contestants Voting

Round 4: Final PK

Episode 4: Top 9 into 8
Special guest singer
King Wang Ye
Caesar Li Mao
Ahu Wang Yuexin
Wuyi
Jaki Tan Jiexi
Jeffrey G Ji Jie
Bird Zhang Yuan
Chen Xiang
Well Li Wei
Professional Judges
Wu Zhoutong
Hu Haiquan
Sa Dingding
Weibo Judges
Sisi Laoshi
Zang Qin
Ting Ye
Ye Zichun
Li Wei()
1,000 Public Audiences (votes)

Round 1: Help to Sing PK
 Contestant №8 Yang Yang penalize for Round 1

Round 1 PK

Round 2: Duo PK
 Contestant №1 Yu Jiali penalize for Round 2

Round 3: Special guest singer Voting

Round 4: Final PK

Episode 5: Top 8 into 7
Special guest singer
Sun Nan
Professional Judges
Wu Zhoutong
Hu Haiquan
Sa Dingding
Weibo Judges
Li Yang
Bufeiyan
Li Xiaonan
Wang Shasha
Mu Xiaodan
1,000 Public Audiences (votes)

Round 1: Spinning Wheel PK
 Contestant №2 Lisi Danni penalize for Round 1

Round 1 PK

Round 2: Contestant Selection PK 
 Contestant №5 Fu Mengni penalize for Round 2

Round 3: Final PK
 Contestant №5 Fu Mengni selected Contestant №7 Wang Yijie for Final PK and selected Contestant №9 Su Miaoling for auto advancement.

Top 13 final contestants

References

External links
HBS Hunan Satellite TV 2011 Super Girl official site

2011 Chinese television seasons
Singing talent shows
Chinese music television series
Mandopop
Hunan Broadcasting System original programming
2011 in Chinese music